Klang Box was a special-edition boxed set compilation of music by Kraftwerk, issued in the UK in May 1997 as a promotional item ahead of Kraftwerk's 24 May appearance at the Tribal Gathering Festival, held at Luton Hoo, England.

Klang Box contained four 12-inch singles of original recordings compiled from the Trans-Europe Express, Computer World and Electric Café albums, including a rare instrumental edit of "Trans-Europe Express".

The box was assigned the catalogue number Klang Box 101 and, according to an accompanying EMI press release, "1000 copies of ‘Trans Europe Express’ (b/w an instrumental version of the track previously unreleased), 'Numbers,' 'Musique Non Stop,' and 'Home Computer' (b/w "It's More Fun to Compute") are being manufactured, and 250 boxes with a Kraftwerk T-shirt will be made to hold the 4 12-inch records."

Contents
 "Trans-Europe Express" / "Trans-Europe Express·Instr·"  (Klang DJ 101)
 "Numbers" / "Numbers"  (Klang DJ 102)
 "Musique Non-Stop" / "Musique Non-Stop"  (Klang DJ 103)
 "Home Computer" / "It's More Fun to Compute"  (Klang DJ 104)
 Black XL-size T-shirt with a robot motif and the name Kraftwerk (identical to the design on the front lid of the box)

Kraftwerk albums
1997 compilation albums
EMI Records compilation albums